Vilhelm Evgenievich Garf (January 3, 1885 – August 22, 1938) was a Russian and Soviet military leader of German-Latvian descent, Colonel of the General Staff of the Russian Empire. He fought in the First World War, was a member of the Civil War as part of the Red Army, an Officer of the General Staff of the RIA, later - the General Headquarters of the Red Army of the highest service category, division commander and head of the Telecommunications Academy. V.N. Podbelsky. Later he was a victim of political repression in the USSR.

He belonged to a German-Baltic noble family and was an evangelical Lutheran.

His name appeared on the death list of 20 August 1938 which was signed by Joseph Stalin and Vyacheslav Molotov, alongside komkor Vladimir Gittis. He was convicted that day by the Military Collegium of the Supreme Court of the Soviet Union of espionage and sentenced to death. He was executed two days later at Kommunarka.

Biography
Born in Grodno (now the Republic of Belarus), the eldest son in a large family of an officer of the General Staff, later lieutenant general, head of the Main Directorate of Cossack troops Yevgeny Georgievich von Garf and his wife - the daughter of the vice admiral of the Russian fleet Fedor Bogdanovich von Schulz Klara Fedorovna (1857— 1934).

Since 1889, in connection with the transfer of his father to the General Staff, William lived in St. Petersburg. He was educated in the Page Corps of His Imperial Majesty, where on September 1, 1902 he was accepted into service. On August 9, 1904, V. Garf was released from the corps as a second lieutenant in the Life Guards Jaeger Regiment. Two years later he was awarded the rank of lieutenant, and another year later, as he successfully passed the entrance exams, V.E. Garf was enrolled as a student of the Imperial Nikolaev Military Academy, which in 1910 he graduated from the first category with the appointment to the General Staff.

On the same course as Wilhelm Evgenievich studied at the Academy such, subsequently, large military leaders of the Army Paint, such as: Nikolai Sollogub, V.L. Baranovsky, Boris Shaposhnikov, A.I. Verkhovsky. At the same time, many future leaders of the White movement turned out to be graduates of the 1910 Academy: Pyotr Wrangel, M. M. Zinkevich, N. V. Nagaev, V. I. Sidorin, A. L. Nosovich, A. N. Vagin.

From November 1, 1910, for two years, Staff Captain Wilhelm Evgenievich was serving the qualified command of the company in the Life Guards of the Jäger Regiment, according to which on November 26, 1912 he was seconded to the headquarters of the 3rd Army Corps (Russian Empire), stationed in Vilna, where he assumed office senior adjutant.

Participation in the First World War
With the outbreak of the First World War and the formation in July 1914 of the units of the Vilnius District of the 1st Army (Russian Empire), Captain Wilhelm Garf took over the position of senior adjutant of the Quartermaster General of Staff. As part of the Northwestern Front, the 1st Army (Russian Empire), under the command of General Paul von Rennenkampf, entered East Prussia on August 4, 1914. Already in the first weeks of the war, William Garf distinguished himself in the Battle of Gumbinnen. On December 6, 1914, he was awarded the rank of lieutenant colonel, and in February of the following year he was appointed senior adjutant to the commander of the 26th Infantry Division (commander - Major General P. A. Tikhonovich). The division was part of the 2nd Army Corps (Russian Empire), which since August 8 has been part of the 1st Army (Russian Empire). In February, the division advanced to Poland, where V.E. Garf distinguished himself in fierce battles in the area of the town of Sejny (02.25.02.1915), the settlement of Krasnopol (03.15.1915), and the city of Suwalki.

On September 10, 1915, Lieutenant Colonel V.E. Garf was appointed chief of staff of the 69th Infantry Division, which was part of the 21st Army Corps (3rd Army of the Southwestern Front). The division belonged to the second stage of mobilization and was formed only in 1914, that is, after the declaration of war. This meant that the percentage of untrained soldiers in it was much higher than in the divisions of the first stage, which were formed in peacetime. Nevertheless, the division quickly earned a reputation as a reliable connection, having been on the South-Western Front since 1914, where it participated in battles for Lviv and in the siege of the Austrian fortress Przemysl. The following year, the division fought in the Carpathians, then in the summer it passed a difficult route of retreat from Galicia. Wilhelm Garf assumed the post of chief of staff of the division in those days when in the beginning of autumn 1915, as part of 21 corps, she was transferred to the Western Front in the region of Krevo-Smorgon. The division remained here for more than two years, until the dissolution of the imperial army in March 1918 after the Bolsheviks signed the Brest Peace. All this time she waged bloody defensive battles for Smorgon.

The head of the division, Lieutenant General A.P. Gavrilov V.E. Garf, was characterized very highly:
“What are you quoting?”
In the cases of combat operations, the division in the field and in headquarters activities understands skillfully and quickly, and for the success of orientation in battle neglected the danger. As the chief of staff, quite in place, with great tact, with initiative. He treats his subordinates cordially and fairly, and although he is gentle, he is persistent in his requirements. The atmosphere of combat life is very easy, very healthy health. A great.
Signed by the head of the 69th Infantry Division, Lieutenant General Gavrilov. November 18, 1916.
"

In July 1917, units of the 69th division participated in the well-known “Kerensky offensive”. Then Wilhelm Evgenievich received his last military rank in the old army - Colonel (order 15.08.1917). After the October Revolution, Colonel V.E. Garf, in the previous post of Chief of Staff of the 69th Division, remained at the forefront. In the conditions of the collapse of the army, the division was among the few that did not lose their combat effectiveness and controllability. On January 30, 1918, Commander-in-Chief N.V. Krylenko requested Wilhelm Garf to Petrograd, where he appointed him assistant clerk of the Main Directorate of the General Staff. In March 1918, simultaneously with the signing of the Brest Peace, one of the conditions of which was the demobilization of the imperial army, the capital of the republic, and with it the General Directorate of the General Staff were transferred to Moscow. Petrograd and V.E. Garf left Petrograd and V.E. Almost two months later, on May 8, 1918, instead of the Main Directorate of the General Staff, the General Headquarters was created. In it, as a volunteer, Wilhelm Evgenievich took the post of head of the Austrian branch at the Military Statistics Division of the Operations Directorate.

In the service of the Workers 'and Peasants' Red Army
Having believed the calls of the former General Mikhail Dmitriyevich Bonch-Bruyevich, V.E. Garf voluntarily joined the Red Army and on October 8, 1918 was appointed to the headquarters of the Eastern Front. While the front was commanded by Sergey Kamenev, Wilhelm Evgenievich was the head of the operational intelligence department of the front headquarters and field control. With the arrival of the new commander Alexander Samoylo on July 7, 1919, and before the front was disbanded on January 15, 1920, V. E. Garf was the permanent chief of staff of the Eastern Front. After Alexander Samoylo, the front was sequentially commanded by Sergei Kamenev (repeatedly), Pavel Pavlovich Lebedev, Mikhail Frunze, Vladimir Olderogge.
Under the conditions of a constant change of commanders of the Eastern Front, V. E. Garf managed to ensure continuity and controllability of the troops. It's a rare case when one chief of staff “outlived” several of his immediate superiors, who didn't always even manage to get involved in the situation.

After the successful Ufa operation (May 25 - June 20), V. E. Garf, as a recognized specialist in the "field of tactics of military operations using infantry", led the headquarters during the most active offensive operations of the Eastern Front. Under his leadership, the Zlatoust (June 24 - July 13) and Chelyabinsk (July 17 - August 4) operations were developed and successfully conducted.

On August 14, 1919, the southern group of armies of the Eastern Front was transformed into the Turkestan Front. The remaining front forces were tasked with defeating A.V. Kolchak and liberating Siberia. The headquarters developed and carried out the Peter and Paul Operation with great skill from August to November 1919. During the offensive, Tobolsk (October 22), Petropavlovsk (October 31), Omsk (November 14) were liberated. In December, Barnaul (11), Novonikolaevsk (14), Tomsk (20) were taken. Finally, on January 7, 1920, Krasnoyarsk fell. The Peter and Paul offensive led to the complete defeat of the main forces of the army of A.V. Kolchak. The Eastern Front has fully fulfilled its task, and by directive of the High Command of January 6, 1920, the Office of the Eastern Front was disbanded on January 15.

For the final destruction of the scattered remnants of the Kolchak army, the 5th Army was left under the command of Mikhail Matiyasevich. Before the latter took office on February 8, 1920, V.E. Garf commanded the army for some time, after which he was appointed chief of its headquarters.

By the summer of 1920, the last centers of white resistance were suppressed, and on June 23, 1920, Wilhelm Evgenievich was recalled to Moscow. The main battles of the Civil War were completed. For successfully prepared and conducted operations on the Eastern Front of the Civil War, V.E. Garf was awarded the Order of the Red Banner in 1921.
Being a non-partisan representative of a social class alien to the Bolsheviks, and also an ethnic German, for many years Wilhelm Evgenievich held various leadership positions in the headquarters of the Red Army solely because of his professionalism. Over the years, he was: assistant to the chief of the operational management of the field headquarters of the RVSR (07/15/1920 - 01/14/1921); the executive affairs of the head of the organizational management of the headquarters of the Red Army (01/14/1921 - 09.24.1921) the second assistant to the chief of staff of the Red Army (09.24.1921-01.05.1924) (he was in charge of accounting, organization and mobilization; he was subordinated to the departments for command staff, organizational and mobilization). In May 1924, when the accounting and organizational departments were separated into an independent Organization and Accounting Department, V.E. Garf was transferred to the post of its head. In October 1925, Wilhelm Evgenievich became an assistant to the head of the Office of military schools of the Red Army, but after 2 months he was appointed deputy head of the Main Directorate of the Red Army. In January 1927 he took the post of deputy chief of supply of the Red Army, from where in November 1929 he was transferred to the position of assistant chief of arms of the Red Army.

In February 1931, V.E. Garf went on to teaching, first as a military instructor at the Moscow Electrotechnical Institute of Communications (MEIS), and since August 1932, as deputy head of the Telecommunications Engineering Academy named after V.N. Podbelsky at the People's Commissariat of Communications of the USSR. At the same time, Wilhelm Evgenievich headed the command faculty of the Academy, he was assigned the highest service category K-14. In September 1934, he was appointed to his last post - the head of the Academy of Communications named after V.N. Podbelsky. With the introduction of military ranks in the Red Army in September 1935, and order of the USSR People's Commissar of Defense No. 2395 dated November 20, 1935, V.E. Garf was awarded the personal rank of division commander, which can be regarded as a certain reduction. The highest service category K-14 assumed the assignment of a rank not lower than the commander of the 2nd rank. By the arbitrariness of K.E. Voroshilov, such a decrease affected almost all the heads of military academies, with the exception, perhaps, only of A.I.

Wilhelm Evgenievich led the Academy in those years when the difficult process of merging the Moscow Electrotechnical Institute of Communications and the Academy named after V.N. Podbelsky. It ended after his arrest.

Victim of political repression in the USSR
With the onset of the "Great Terror", in early 1938 V.E. Garf was removed from his post and sent to the disposal of the Office of the Red Army. The expected arrest in such cases followed on 10 May. Garf's son Eugene, a fifth-year student of the engineering department of the Military Academy of Chemical Protection, a second-level military technician, was arrested. The investigation did not take much time. Whether it was possible to break the commander or not, now does not establish. One way or another, but he kept silent that his cousin L. L. Kerber, who was arrested ten days earlier, is in one of the neighboring cells of the internal prison on Lubyanka, and thereby saved his life. The NKVD investigators did not find out about the close family ties of the two prisoners arrested almost simultaneously, although on various occasions.

Garf's son Eugene was among those rare lucky ones who were sentenced to a long prison term.

By a resolution of the Military Collegium of the Supreme Court of the USSR of May 28, 1955, V. E. Garf was completely rehabilitated. To his wife, Serafima Vasilievna, Chairman of the Presidium of the Supreme Soviet of the USSR Kliment Voroshilov apologized for the "unfortunate mistake".

Family
Before his arrest, V.E. Garf and his family lived in the model house 9/11 in Potapovsky Lane, where many famous Soviet leaders, including senior commanders, settled.
wife: Serafima Vasilievna ur. Shlyapnikov (1885-1957);
son: Eugene Wilhelmovich Garf (1913-1977);
daughter: Tatyana Vilgelmovna Luzanova (1921-1990) - wife of the People's Artist of the RSFSR Fedor Petrovich Luzanov;
brother: Evgeny Evgenievich (1895-1916) - staff captain, participant in the First World War. He died on September 3, 1916, was buried in the crypt of the Mironievskaya Church of the Life Guards of the Jäger Regiment;
uncle: vice admiral Ludwig Bernhardovich von Kerber;
cousin: Victor L. Corvin-Kerber (1894-1970) - staff captain, life huntsman, participant in the First World War. Later - a marine pilot, aircraft designer;
cousin: Leonid Lvovich Kerber (1903-1993) - Doctor of Technical Sciences, aircraft designer, deputy general designer of design bureaus A. N. Tupolev for equipment;
cousin: Boris Lvovich Kerber (1907-1978) - aircraft designer, deputy general designer of design bureaus A. Mikoyan for equipment;
uncle: Vice Admiral Maximilian Fedorovich von Schulz;
uncle: 2nd-rank captain Konstantin Fedorovich von Schulz.

Awards
Order of St. Anne 4th degree
Order of St. Stanislav 3rd degree with swords and bow;
Order of St. Anne of the 3rd degree with swords and bow;
Order of St. Stanislav 2nd degree with swords;
Order of St. Anne of the 2nd degree with swords;
Order of St. Vladimir 4th degree with swords and bow;
Order of the Red Banner.

Bibliography
Garf, Wilhelm Evgenievich. // Project "Russian Army in the Great War" .;
Garf Wilhelm Evgenievich; Biography on the site "Russian Imperial Army";
Kopytov G.A. Kerbery. Surname code. XIV — XXI centuries second book // ed. "Petersburg - XXI century." 2013;
Volkov S.V. Officers of the Russian Guard. - M .: 2002;
Cherushev N.S., Cherushev Yu.N. The executed elite of the Red Army (commanders of the 1st and 2nd ranks, comkors, divisional commanders and their peers): 1937–1941. Biographical Dictionary. - M .: Kuchkovo field; Megapolis, 2012 .-- S. 203–204. - 496 p. - 2000 copies. -  ..

References

1885 births
1938 deaths
Russian military personnel of World War I
Soviet military personnel of the Russian Civil War
Soviet komdivs
People executed by the Soviet Union
Great Purge victims from Belarus
Soviet rehabilitations